In computer graphics, relief mapping is a texture mapping technique first introduced in 2000 used to render the surface details of three-dimensional objects accurately and efficiently. It can produce accurate depictions of self-occlusion, self-shadowing, and parallax. It is a form of short-distance ray tracing done in a pixel shader. Relief mapping is highly comparable in both function and approach to another displacement texture mapping technique, Parallax occlusion mapping, considering that they both rely on ray tracing, though the two are not to be confused with each other, as parallax occlusion mapping uses reverse heightmap tracing.

See also

 Shaded relief

References

External links
 Manuel's Relief texture mapping

3D computer graphics
Texture mapping